Krischan and similar are surnames deriving from a German dialect of the word Christian or Christ. Alternative spellings include Krisch, Krische, Krischer, Krischmann, Krizan, Krischon and Krishan.  The Krischan surname is German in origin. The name is also used as a first name mostly in German speaking countries serving as a variant of the more common first name Christian.  It is also speculated that the name is largely east German in origin considering the likelihood of Slavic influence in the spelling.  Much of eastern Germany throughout history was at one point or another settled by Slavic tribes and the influence of Slavic languages becomes evident in various personal, place and surnames of the region.

People with the surname
 (born 1954), German jazz musician
Jacob Krisch, American football player for 2014 Minnesota Golden Gophers football team
 Johannes Krisch (1966-Present), Austrian actor
Kevin Krisch, Austrian footballer for First Vienna FC
Jean Krisch (born 1939), American physicist
 (born 1974), German rower
 Nico Krisch (1972-Present), European legal scholar, specializing in international law, constitutional theory, and global governance
 Friedrich Krischan (1920–2007), Austrian cross country skier
 Jakob Krischan (1894–1970), Austrian politician 
 Thomas Krischan, American video Game Developer who created Valley of the Kings (video game) for Atari.
 Mircea Krishan (1924–2013), German-Romanian actor
 Joseph Krische Former U.S. National Team Soccer Defender
 Michael J. Krische (born 1966), American Chemist of Gottschee German descent.
 Oliver Krischer (1969-Present), German politician

German Naval Ships
Krischan der Große: anti-aircraft vessel
Krischan II (from 1936 Gunther Plüschow): air control ship
Krischan III (from 1936 Bernhard von Tschirschk): air control ship
Krischan: air control ship

References

See also
Krieschwej, a commune in Cluj County, Transylvania.
Krischwitz
Kříše (German: Krisch), a former Czech village in what is now Břasy
Krisch, a page for this stand alone surname without related names.

Surnames from given names